Ben Ching Tsun Yin, better known by his stage name Tyson Yoshi (born  17 July 1994) is a Hong Kong rapper, singer,  songwriter, and model. 

He is an independent artist and was formerly part of the Hip Hop and R&B label Greytone Music (灰階音樂). He released his first official song “TO MY QUEEN” in 2018. In July 2019, he released "Christy", which was his first song that surpassed 1 million views on YouTube. His first album, 1st, was then released in 2019. He is one of Hong Kong's best-known hip hop artists and rappers, with over 2 million streams on Spotify in more than 100 countries in 2019, one of the highest of any Hong Kong artist.

Discography

Songs 
 TO MY QUEEN 
 Stranger
 Don't Care (Prod. J1M3)
 BAE
 She Said
 SP (Prod. JNYBeatz)
 Bn2 4dn (Prod. RainAttack)
 What I'm Feeling (SHIMICA feat. Tyson Yoshi, Prod. SILVERSTRIKE)
 I Don't Give A, Pt. 2 (Tyson Yoshi & Madboii, Prod. Madboii)
 Let Go (Tyson Yoshi & Akiko, Prod. JNYBeatz)
 To My Boss (Tyson Yoshi & TomFatKi)
 I'm Not Lonely Anymore
 Christy (Prod. Madboii)
 Right Here (Tyson Yoshi & Tiab)
 寂寞男孩 (Marz23 feat. Tyson Yoshi)
 Growing Up
 fly(aleebi)
 毒男
 Something
 december (Tyson Yoshi & Gareth.T)
 That Guy
 if I die tonight
 Self-Made (Something pt.2)
 Optimistic

Cantonese:
 Better
 2nd Favourite (Tyson Yoshi & Leo Ku)
 i don’t smoke & i don’t drink (Prod. SILVERSTRIKE)

Album 
 1st

Concerts

Concert participation

See also 
 Hong Kong hip hop

References

External links 
 Tyson Yoshi on Instagram
 TysonYoshi on Facebook
 Tyson Yoshi on YouTube
 Tyson Yoshi on Spotify
 Tyson Yoshi on SoundCloud

1994 births
Living people
Hong Kong male rappers
21st-century Hong Kong male singers
Hong Kong hip hop musicians
Hong Kong expatriates in the United Kingdom
English-language singers from Hong Kong
Hong Kong idols